Braevallich is a village in Argyll and Bute, Scotland.

Villages in Argyll and Bute